Two ships of the United States Navy have been named Cotinga, after the Cotinga, a passerine bird of South and Central America.

 , was launched 25 March 1941.
 , the former LCI(L)-776; renamed and reclassified AMCU-22 on 7 March 1952.

Sources
 

United States Navy ship names